José René Villafuerte Flores (born 26 January 1997) known as René Villa, is a Costa Rican singer-songwriter and model.

Biography 
René Villa was born January 26, 1997, in Nicoya. When a kid, Villa was heavily into Carlos Rivera, Luis Fonsi,  Christina Aguilera and Mariah Carey. Especially Carey influenced his music style, to bring different types of music together.

Throughout his career René has worked with Alan Shepard as well as Nelss, Carlox, among countless others.

As a solo artist, he's released 2 albums and EPs that defy category, traversing intimate singer songwriter, pop, Latin pop, pop rock, electronic and dance.

René submitted the first songs he ever wrote, and soon found himself making his debut with “Dónde Estás”, under the name of Shory Flores. That fateful turn of events changed his life as a musician, shifting his focus to composition and singing, and sending him on a profoundly winding and rewarding musical journey.

Before changing his artist name, the songs were released by his old names, including "Juntos (Al Amanecer)" and "Te Quiero (Pa' Mi)".

During 2020, Villa participated on Alan Shepard's album “The Right Time”, which is the featuring in ”A Tu Lado" under the pseudo name of “Jay Flores”.

In 2021, the album RAWR is released in the UK, which contains 9 songs, including “It’s Your Fault”, written by René and produced by Alan Shepard, Costa Rican musician and producer.

Discography

Singles & EPs 
 Dónde Estás (2015)
 Falsas Promesas de Amor (2015)
Juntos (Al Amanecer) (2016)
Te Quiero (Pa' Mí) (2019)
Es Imposible (2021)
Si Tú No Estás (2022)
En Peligro de Extinción (2022)
Mistakes (2022)

Albums 
 Summer Dreaming (2020)
Rawr (2021)

References

External links
 Official Website

1990 births
Living people
Costa Rican male singers
Latin music songwriters